Argyresthia atlanticella is a moth of the  family Yponomeutidae. It is found on the Azores.

Adults usually have a white head and two longitudinal white marks along the forewings. Other morphs have a brown head and the white marks are more or less reduced or even completely lacking. They are on wing from July to August.

The larvae feed on Myrica faya, Erica scoparia azorica and Vaccinium cylindraceum. They feed on the male flowers and green fruits of their host plant. The first and second larval stages are milky-white, except for the head capsule and the cephalic and anal plates which are dark-brown. The third and fourth larval stages have a red pattern at the dorsum. Larvae can be found from April to August.

References

Moths described in 1940
Argyresthia
Endemic arthropods of the Azores
Moths of Europe